IKS (InformCourier-Svyaz) is a Russian business monthly magazine devoted to telecommunications, mass media and information technology  in Russia and CIS countries.

History and profile
It was established in 1992 as a bulletin InformCourier. Among its founders are major Russian telecom businesses, such as Giprosvyaz, Intersputnik, and Rostelekom. The magazine is headquartered in Moscow.

In 1999 a closed joint stock company, IKS-Holding was formed  to handle the publishing of the magazine. Today the magazine is only part of the company's business

IKS magazine is issued both in printed and online versions.

References

External links

1992 establishments in Russia
Magazines established in 1992
Magazines published in Moscow
Business magazines published in Russia
Computer magazines published in Russia
Russian-language magazines
Monthly magazines published in Russia
Science and technology magazines published in Russia
Telecommunications in Russia
Magazines about the media